Teurisci was a Dacian tribe at the time of Ptolemy (140 AD). They were originally considered a branch of the Celtic Taurisci (Noricum), who moved to Upper Tisza. However, the archaeology shows that Celts have been absorbed by Dacians, at some point creating a Celto-Dacian cultural horizon in the upper Tisza.

Name 
The name Teurisci is considered a variant of Taurisci or Tauristae.

Distribution

Taurisci 

The Celtic Taurisci were settled in the south-eastern Alps and were known from the name of Mount Taurus. Due to iron mining, their centers (i.e. Noreia - now Newmarkt  and Virunum now Magdalensburg) enjoyed great success in trade and commerce with the Balkans. The lowland Taurisci gradually grew in power and became largely separate from their mountain relatives. Therefore, the inhabitants of this eastern area became known collectively – from the place name Noreia – as Norici and the territory under their control as Noricum.

Teurisci 

Teurisci, attested by Ptolemy in Dacia, were originally  a group of the Celtic Taurisci from the Austrian Alps established in North-Western Dacia at the end of Iron Age.

Historical evidence 

In 60 BC, when the king of the Dacians Burebista succeeded in uniting his own people with their kindred Getae and Burs into one kingdom he began to put pressure on the Celtic tribes of the Danubian Basin. He advanced against the Taurisci and Boii, gaining his most notable success near to the river Tisza  After defeating the Taurisci (Cotini) and Boii, the Dacian King Burebista forced some of them to leave southwestern Slovakia. A Celto-Dacian cultural horizon was created in the conquered territory, Dacian settlement here continued into the second decade of the new era.

Posidonius record that, at his time, Celtic (Boii, Scordisci, and Taurisci) were intermingling with Thracians on both sides of the Danube. Later, Strabo (about 20 AD), repeat this piece of information, yet he uses the variant Ligyrisci instead of the Posidinius's variant Teurisci.  
 
According to Ptolemy (140 AD), Teurisci of Dacia bordered Anarti of Dacia on the east. Further east of them were the Dacian Costoboci.

Archaeological evidence 

About 150 BC, Celtic La Tène material disappears from Dacia. This coincides with the ancient writings which mentioned the rise of the Dacian authority. It ended the Celtic domination and it is possible Celts were thrust out of Dacia. Alternatively, some scholars have proposed that the Transylvanian Celts remained but merged into the local culture and thus ceased to be distinctive The Celtic groups which spread as far as Transylvania had been assimilated by the Dacians,

See also
List of ancient cities in Thrace and Dacia

Notes

References 

 Koch, John T (2005). ‘’Dacians and Celts’’ in Celtic culture: a historical encyclopedia, Volume 1,. ABC-CLIO. ., page 549
 Mannova Elena (1963) Studia historica Slovaca Bratislava : Vydavatel̕stvo Slovenskej Akadémie 
 Oltean, Ioana, (2007) Dacia: Landscape, Colonization and Romanization, Routledge,

External links 

Ancient tribes in Dacia
Historical Celtic peoples
Gauls